Franklin County is one of the 141 Cadastral divisions of New South Wales. It lies between Waverley Creek and the Lachlan River, in the area to the north-west of Hillston.

Franklin County was named in honour of the Arctic explorer, Rear Admiral, and Lieutenant-Governor Sir John Franklin (1786-1847).

Parishes within this county
A full list of parishes found within this county; their current LGA and mapping coordinates to the approximate centre of each location is as follows:

References

 
Counties of New South Wales